Gayatri Devi (born as Princess Gayatri Devi of Cooch Behar; 23 May 1919 − 29 July 2009) was the third Maharani consort of Jaipur from 1940 to 1949 through her marriage to Maharaja Sawai Man Singh II. Following her husband's signature for the Jaipur State to become part of the Union of India and her step-son's assumption of the title in 1970, she was known as Maharani Gayatri Devi, Rajmata of Jaipur.

She was born in the Hindu Royal family of Cooch Behar.  Her father was Maharaja Jitendra Narayan of Cooch Behar in West Bengal, and her mother was Maratha Princess, Indira Raje of Baroda, the only daughter of Maharaja Sayajirao Gaekwad III, and she was sister to Jagaddipendra Narayan, informally known as 'Bhaiya', who became the Maharajah of Cooch Behar.

Following India's independence and the abolition of the princely states, she became a successful politician in the Swatantra Party. Gayatri was also celebrated for her beauty and became something of a fashion icon in her adulthood. She served 12 years in Swatantra Party, during which she was a prominent critic of Indira Gandhi's government. After her departure from politics, she lived a quiet life in her large estate, spending time with her grandchildren and on hobbies and leisure.

She died on 29 July 2009 in Jaipur, at the age of 90. She was suffering from paralytic ileus and a lung infection.

Early life

Born in a Hindu Royal family, her father, Prince Jitendra Narayan of Cooch Behar, presently in West Bengal, was the younger brother of the Yuvaraja (Crown Prince). Her mother was Maratha Princess Indira Raje of Baroda, the only daughter of Maratha King, Maharaja Sayajirao Gaekwad III, an extremely beautiful princess and a legendary socialite. Early in her life, her uncle's death led to her father ascending the throne (gaddi). Gayatri studied at Glendower Preparatory School in London, Patha Bhavana of Visva-Bharati University, Shantiniketan, and later in Lausanne, Switzerland, where she travelled with her mother and siblings, then studied secretarial skills in London School of Secretaries; Brillantmont and Monkey Club London.

She first met Sawai Man Singh II when she was 12 and he had come to Calcutta to play polo and stayed with their family. She married Sawai Man Singh II Bahadur on 9 May 1940.

Gayatri was a particularly avid equestrienne. She was an excellent rider and an able Polo player. She was a good shot and enjoyed many days out on 'Shikars'. Gayatri was fond of cars and is credited with importing the first Mercedes-Benz W126, a 500 SEL to India which was later shipped to Malaysia. She also owned several Rolls-Royces and an aircraft. Gayatri had one child, Prince Jagat Singh of Jaipur, late Raja of Isarda, born on 15 October 1949, who was granted his uncle's fief as a subsidiary title. Jagat Singh was the half-brother to Bhawani Singh, who was the eldest son of his father born by his father's first wife. Gayatri was once included in Vogue magazine's Ten Most Beautiful Women list.

She started two schools in Jaipur,  Maharani Gayatri Devi Girls’ Public School established in 1943  and the other one being Maharaja Sawai Man Singh Vidyalaya, Jaipur which is a co-educational school opened in the memory of her husband Maharaja Sawai Man Singh of Jaipur. She revived and promoted the dying art of blue pottery.

Political career
After partition and independence of India in 1947, Gayatri Devi ran for Parliament in 1962 and won the constituency in the Lok Sabha in the world's largest landslide, winning 192,909 votes out of 246,516 cast. She continued to hold this seat on 1967 and 1971 as a member of the Swatantra Party founded by C. Rajagopalachari, running against the Indian National Congress party.

In 1965, during a meeting with Prime Minister Lal Bahadur Shastri, Gayatri was again asked to join Congress. This was the time when, despite the fact that her husband was being made ambassador to Spain, she stuck to her principles and decided not to join the party. In 1967 the Swatantra party joined hands with Jan Sangh that was led by Bhairon Singh Shekhawat. The alliance won a large number of seats in the 1967 election. In the assembly election Gayatri lost to Damodar Lal Vyas, in Malpura constituency, but won the Lok Sabha election.

The privy purses were abolished in 1971, terminating all royal privileges and titles. Gayatri was arrested during the Emergency due to an alleged political vendetta on the false accusation of violating tax laws, and served 5 months in Tihar Jail. She retired from politics and published her biography, A Princess Remembers, written by Santha Rama Rau, in 1976 (this biography also published in Marathi language as A Princess Remembers: Gayatri Devi). She was also the focus of the film Memoirs of a Hindu Princess, directed by Francois Levie.

There were rumours that she might re-enter politics as late as 1999, when the Cooch Behar Trinamool Congress nominated her as their candidate for the Lok Sabha elections, but she did not respond to the offer.

Family
Gayatri Devi had one son, Prince Jagat Singh, Raja of Isarda (15 October 1949 – 5 February 1997), who was granted his paternal uncle's (father's elder brother) fief of Isarda as a subsidiary title. Jagat Singh was married on 10 May 1978 to Mom Rajawongse Priyanandana Rangsit (b. 1952), daughter of Prince Piyarangsit Rangsit and Princess Vibhavadi Rangsit (née Rajani) of Thailand. The married couple had two children:
 Rajkumari Lalitya Kumari (b. 1979)
 Maharaj Devraj Singh, Raja of Isarda (b. 1981)
Today, they are her only surviving descendants, and as such, have claimed to be heirs of their paternal grandmother.
Maharaj Jagat Singh was, thus, half-brother to Bhawani Singh of Jaipur, the eldest son of the late Maharaja by his first wife, a Jodhpur princess.

Family relationships

Gayatri Devi was related to several other erstwhile royal families in India. She was herself not from the Rajput community, but from a dynasty native to Cooch Behar in Bengal, and was daughter of Maharaja Jitendra Narayan and Maharani Indira Raje, who was daughter of Maharaja Sayajirao Gaekwad III and Maharani Chimnabai, belonging to the Gaekwad dynasty of the Marathas. Her grand-nephew, along with his wife, Poonam Singh Mewar, and 2 sons died in a car crash.

Her paternal grandparents were Nripendra Narayan Bhup Bahadur and Sunity Devi of Cooch Behar.  Maharani Sunity Devi was the daughter of the Brahmo social reformer Keshab Chandra Sen.

She had two brothers, Jagaddipendra Narayan and Indrajitendra Narayan of whom Jagaddipendra Narayan became the Maharaja of Cooch Behar in his infancy after the death of their father in 1922.

Thus, maternally, she was closely connected to Gaekwads of Baroda State. Further, her sister Ila Devi was married into the Tripura royal family, and her younger sister, Maneka Devi, was married into the royal family of Dewas State. Thus, through various interconnections, she was related to the royal houses of Kota, Sawantwadi, Akkalkot State, Jath State, Dewas Jr., Jasdan State, and Sandur, Tehri-Garhwal, Mayurbhanj, Dhar State, Kolhapur, Lunawada State, Baria and Raja of Payagpur, which was considered normal amongst the royalties of India.

Death
She was admitted at Santokba Durlabhji Memorial hospital (SDMH) on 17 July 2009. She died at the age of 90 on 29 July 2009, reportedly due to lung failure.

Filmography 
 Stephane Bern. Gayatra Devi, une princesse au pays des Maharajas. Documentary by Roland Portiche and Vanessa Pontet. 1h45'. 2013. First broadcast on 26 December 2013, FR2 (French TV).

References

Additional sources

External links
 
 
 
 

1919 births
2009 deaths
Queen mothers
People from Jaipur
Women in Rajasthan politics
India MPs 1962–1967
India MPs 1967–1970
India MPs 1971–1977
Indian queen consorts
History of Jaipur
Visva-Bharati University alumni
People educated at Glendower Preparatory School
Bengali Hindus
People from West Bengal
Swatantra Party politicians
Lok Sabha members from Rajasthan
Indians imprisoned during the Emergency (India)
Founders of Indian schools and colleges
People from Cooch Behar district
20th-century Indian women politicians
Indian princesses
Politicians from Jaipur
Rajasthani people
Indian Hindus
Women members of the Lok Sabha
Indian polo players